Benito Martinez may refer to:

 Benito Martínez (died 2006), Cuban who claimed to be the world's oldest living person
 Benito Martinez (actor) (born 1970), American actor
 Benito Martinez (soldier) (1932–1952), American soldier, Korean War Medal of Honor recipient
Bad Bunny (born 1994), Puerto Rican singer